Edhem is a Bosnian given name for males, spelled Adham in Arabic. It has also been used as a surname. Notable people named Edhem include:

Given name
 Edhem Bičakčić (1884–1941), Bosnian politician, mayor of Sarajevo
 Edhem Mulabdić (1862–1954), Bosnian writer and co-founder of the political journal Behar
 Edhem Pasha (1851–1909), Ottoman field marshal
 Edhem Šljivo (born 1950), Bosnian football midfielder

Surname
 Emma Edhem (born 1966), councilwoman of the City of London

Bosnian masculine given names